Leonardo Domenici (born 12 July 1955) is an Italian politician. He served as Mayor of Florence from 1999 to 2009.

Biography 
Leonardo Domenici was born in Florence in 1955, later graduating in moral philosophy from the University of Florence.

Political life 
Domenici started his political career in 1976.

He was elected MP in 1994 and re-elected in the following elections in 1996. He spent a lot of time working for the “Institutional Affairs” commission at the Italian Chamber of Deputies, dedicating his efforts in the reforms of Regions and local institutions.

As Mayor of Florence 
Guiding a centre-left coalition, on 13 June 1999, he was elected Mayor of Florence at the first round and, on 27 June 2004, was elected again for a second term. 
He was the Chairman of ANCI, the national association of Italian municipalities (2000-2009), and a member of the Bureau of the Committee of the Regions (2008-2009).

Domenici awarded Dante Alighieri the city's highest honour and revoked the sentence on the poet from 1302 which stated that he would be executed if he set foot in the city again.

As Member of European Parliament 
Currently, Leonardo Domenici is an MEP, belonging to the Progressive Alliance of Socialists and Democrats (S&D), where he is member of the Committee on Economic and Monetary Affairs and of the Delegation to the EU-Russia Parliamentary Cooperation Committee.

Since 2011 he is rapporteur for the European Parliament on the credit rating agencies regulation.

As President of Fiorentina 

In 2002 Leonardo Domenici, as Mayor of Florence, created a new football society, Fiorentina 1926 Florentia, later Florentia Viola, in order to replace the bankrupted AC Fiorentina.

He was the President of this new society until Diego Della Valle bought the team.

Awards 

  Grand Decoration of Honour in Gold with Star (Großes Goldenes Ehrenzeichen mit Stern), Republic of Austria

Controversies 
In February 2008, Domenici and one of the city assessors of Florence announced intentions to launch a suit against the free online encyclopedia Wikipedia.

See also 
 2009 European Parliament election in Italy

References

External links 
 Official Site
 MEP profile
 S&D profile

1955 births
Living people
Mayors of Florence
Italian Communist Party politicians
20th-century Italian politicians
Democratic Party (Italy) MEPs
MEPs for Italy 2009–2014
21st-century Italian politicians
Democrats of the Left politicians
Democratic Party of the Left politicians